Eva Catharina König née Hahn (22nd March 1736 - 10th January 1778) was a German woman letter writer.

Life 
In 1756, Eva König married the Hamburg businessman Engelbert König. The couple had four children: Maria Amalie Henneberg, Theodor, Engelbert, and Fritz. In 1767, she became friends with the playwright Gotthold Ephraim Lessing, godfather to her son Fritz who looked after her when her husband died in 1769. A few years later, in 1771 they became engaged.

Due to matters related to König's estate, Eva made several visits to Vienna over a lengthy period. She also had to accompany the young Prince Leopold of Brunswick-Wolfenbüttel, who would later become a Prussian General in 1775. As a result, the couple's mode of contact during their engagement was through written correspondence, most of which has survived. In 1776 they were married in Jork, a town near Hamburg.

Eva Lessing then moved to Wolfenbüttel with her husband where she died in 1778 at the age of 41 of neonatal sepsis soon after the birth of their son Traugott Lessing. She was buried at Bürger Friedhof hinter der Trinitatiskirche, in Wolfenbüttel, Landkreis Wolfenbüttel, Lower Saxony (Niedersachsen), Germany.

References

1736 births
1778 deaths
German letter writers
Women letter writers
Gotthold Ephraim Lessing
Writers from Heidelberg